The Soldier River is a tributary of the Missouri River, about  long, in western Iowa in the United States.  Several portions of the river's course have been straightened and channelized.

The Soldier River rises in southeastern Ida County and flows generally southwestwardly through northwestern Crawford, southeastern Monona and northwestern Harrison Counties, past the towns of Ute, Soldier, Moorhead and Pisgah.  It flows into the Missouri River via a diversion channel about 5 mi (8 km) west-northwest of Mondamin.

At Ute, the river collects the East Soldier River, which rises near Schleswig and flows past Charter Oak.  The East Soldier River collects the Middle Soldier River, which flows past Ricketts.

See also
List of Iowa rivers

References

Columbia Gazetteer of North America entry
DeLorme (1998).  Iowa Atlas & Gazetteer.  Yarmouth, Maine: DeLorme.  .

Rivers of Iowa
Tributaries of the Missouri River
Rivers of Crawford County, Iowa
Rivers of Harrison County, Iowa
Rivers of Ida County, Iowa
Rivers of Monona County, Iowa